Theodorus Lambertus Mathis Thurlings (Tegelen, 24 December 1916 – Wageningen, 10 September 1997) was a Dutch economist and politician.

He was a member of the CDA. He was president of the Dutch Senate from 1973 till 1983. He  was preceded Maarten de Niet Gerritzoon and was succeeded by Piet Steenkamp.

Decorations
: Knight Grand Cross of the Order of the Netherlands Lion
: Officer of the Order of Orange-Nassau

References

1916 births
1997 deaths
Presidents of the Senate (Netherlands)
Members of the Senate (Netherlands)
Christian Democratic Appeal politicians
Catholic People's Party politicians
20th-century Dutch politicians
Dutch Roman Catholics
People from Tegelen
Academic staff of Wageningen University and Research
20th-century  Dutch  economists